In computing, a printer is a peripheral machine which makes a persistent representation of graphics or text, usually on paper. While most output is human-readable, bar code printers are an example of an expanded use for printers. Different types of printers include 3D printers, inkjet printers, laser printers, and thermal printers.

History
The first computer printer designed was a mechanically driven apparatus by Charles Babbage for his difference engine in the 19th century; however, his mechanical printer design was not built until 2000.

The first patented printing mechanism for applying a marking medium to a recording medium or more particularly an electrostatic inking apparatus and a method for electrostatically depositing ink on controlled areas of a receiving medium, was in 1962 by C. R. Winston, Teletype Corporation, using continuous inkjet printing. The ink was a red stamp-pad ink manufactured by Phillips Process Company of Rochester, NY under the name Clear Print. This patent (US3060429) led to the Teletype Inktronic Printer product delivered to customers in late 1966.

The first compact, lightweight digital printer was the EP-101, invented by Japanese company Epson and released in 1968, according to Epson.

The first commercial printers generally used mechanisms from electric typewriters and Teletype machines. The demand for higher speed led to the development of new systems specifically for computer use. In the 1980s there were daisy wheel systems similar to typewriters, line printers that produced similar output but at much higher speed, and dot-matrix systems that could mix text and graphics but produced relatively low-quality output. The plotter was used for those requiring high-quality line art like blueprints.

The introduction of the low-cost laser printer in 1984, with the first HP LaserJet, and the addition of PostScript in next year's Apple LaserWriter set off a revolution in printing known as desktop publishing. Laser printers using PostScript mixed text and graphics, like dot-matrix printers, but at quality levels formerly available only from commercial typesetting systems. By 1990, most simple printing tasks like fliers and brochures were now created on personal computers and then laser printed; expensive offset printing systems were being dumped as scrap. The HP Deskjet of 1988 offered the same advantages as a laser printer in terms of flexibility, but produced somewhat lower-quality output (depending on the paper) from much less-expensive mechanisms. Inkjet systems rapidly displaced dot-matrix and daisy-wheel printers from the market. By the 2000s, high-quality printers of this sort had fallen under the $100 price point and became commonplace.

The rapid improvement of internet email through the 1990s and into the 2000s has largely displaced the need for printing as a means of moving documents, and a wide variety of reliable storage systems means that a "physical backup" is of little benefit today.

Starting around 2010, 3D printing became an area of intense interest, allowing the creation of physical objects with the same sort of effort as an early laser printer required to produce a brochure. As of the 2020s, 3D printing has become a widespread hobby due to the abundance of cheap 3D printer kits, with the most common process being Fused deposition modeling.

Types
Personal printers are mainly designed to support individual users, and may be connected to only a single computer. These printers are designed for low-volume, short-turnaround print jobs, requiring minimal setup time to produce a hard copy of a given document. However, they are generally slow devices ranging from 6 to around 25 pages per minute (ppm),  
and the cost per page is relatively high. However, this is offset by the on-demand convenience. Some printers can print documents stored on memory cards or from digital cameras and scanners.

Networked or shared printers are "designed for high-volume, high-speed printing".  They are usually shared by many users on a network and can print at speeds of 45 to around 100 ppm. The Xerox 9700 could achieve 120 ppm.

A virtual printer is a piece of computer software whose user interface and API resembles that of a printer driver, but which is not connected with a physical computer printer. A virtual printer can be used to create a file which is an image of the data which would be printed, for archival purposes or as input to another program, for example to create a PDF or to transmit to another system or user.

A barcode printer is a computer peripheral for printing barcode labels or tags that can be attached to, or printed directly on, physical objects. Barcode printers are commonly used to label cartons before shipment, or to label retail items with UPCs or EANs.

A 3D printer is a device for making a three-dimensional object from a 3D model or other electronic data source through additive processes in which successive layers of material (including plastics, metals, food, cement, wood, and other materials) are laid down under computer control.  It is called a printer by analogy with an inkjet printer which produces a two-dimensional document by a similar process of depositing a layer of ink on paper.

ID Card printers
A card printer is an electronic desktop printer with single card feeders which print and personalize plastic cards.  In this respect they differ from, for example, label printers which have a continuous supply feed.  Card dimensions are usually 85.60 × 53.98 mm, standardized under ISO/IEC 7810 as ID-1.  This format is also used in EC-cards, telephone cards, credit cards, driver's licenses and health insurance cards.  This is commonly known as the bank card format.  Card printers are controlled by corresponding printer drivers or by means of a specific programming language. Generally card printers are designed with laminating, striping, and punching functions, and use  desktop or web-based software. The hardware features of a card printer differentiate a card printer from the more traditional printers, as ID cards are usually made of PVC plastic and require laminating and punching. Different card printers can accept different card thickness and dimensions.

The principle is the same for practically all card printers: the plastic card is passed through a thermal print head at the same time as a color ribbon.  The color from the ribbon is transferred onto the card through the heat given out from the print head.  The standard performance for card printing is 300 dpi (300 dots per inch, equivalent to 11.8 dots per mm). There are different printing processes, which vary in their detail:
 Thermal transfer Mainly used to personalize pre-printed plastic cards in monochrome.  The color is "transferred" from the (monochrome) color ribbon onto the card.
 Dye sublimation This process uses four panels of color according to the CMYK color ribbon.  The card to be printed passes under the print head several times each time with the corresponding ribbon panel.  Each color in turn is diffused (sublimated) directly onto the card.  Thus it is possible to produce a high depth of color (up to 16 million shades) on the card.  Afterwards a transparent overlay (O) also known as a topcoat (T) is placed over the card to protect it from mechanical wear and tear and to render the printed image UV resistant.
 Reverse image technology The standard for high-security card applications that use contact and contactless smart chip cards.  The technology prints images onto the underside of a special film that fuses to the surface of a card through heat and pressure.  Since this process transfers dyes and resins directly onto a smooth, flexible film, the print-head never comes in contact with the card surface itself.  As such, card surface interruptions such as smart chips, ridges caused by internal RFID antennae and debris do not affect print quality. Even printing over the edge is possible.
 Thermal rewrite print process In contrast to the majority of other card printers, in the thermal rewrite process the card is not personalized through the use of a color ribbon, but by activating a thermal sensitive foil within the card itself.  These cards can be repeatedly personalized, erased and rewritten.  The most frequent use of these are in chip-based student identity cards, whose validity changes every semester.

 Common printing problems: Many printing problems are caused by physical defects in the card material itself, such as deformation or warping of the card that is fed into the machine in the first place. Printing irregularities can also result from chip or antenna embedding that alters the thickness of the plastic and interferes with the printer's effectiveness. Other issues are often caused by operator errors, such as users attempting to feed non-compatible cards into the card printer, while other printing defects may result from environmental abnormalities such as dirt or contaminants on the card or in the printer. Reverse transfer printers are less vulnerable to common printing problems than direct-to-card printers, since with these printers the card does not come into direct contact with the printhead.

 Variations in card printers:
 Broadly speaking there are three main types of card printers, differing mainly by the method used to print onto the card. They are:
 Near to Edge. This term designates the cheapest type of printing by card printers. These printers print up to 5 mm from the edge of the card stock.
 Direct to Card, also known as "Edge to Edge Printing". The print-head comes in direct contact with the card. This printing type is the most popular nowadays, mostly due to cost factor. The majority of identification card printers today are of this type.
 Reverse Transfer, also known as "High Definition Printing" or "Over the Edge Printing". The print-head prints to a transfer film backwards (hence the reverse) and then the printed film is rolled onto the card with intense heat (hence the transfer). The term "over the edge" is due to the fact that when the printer prints onto the film it has a "bleed", and when rolled onto the card the bleed extends to completely over the edge of the card, leaving no border.

 Different ID Card Printers use different encoding techniques to facilitate disparate business environments and to support security initiatives. Known encoding techniques are:
 Contact Smart Card – The Contact Smart Cards use RFID technology and require direct contact to a conductive plate to register admission or transfer of information. The transmission of commands, data, and card status held between the two physical contact points.
 Contactless Smart Card – Contactless Smart Cards exhibit integrated circuit that can store and process data while communicating with the terminal via Radio Frequency. Unlike Contact Smart Card, contact less cards feature intelligent re-writable microchip that can be transcribed through radio waves.
 HiD Proximity – HID's proximity technology allows fast, accurate reading while offering card or key tag read ranges from 4” to 24” inches (10 cm to 60.96 cm), dependent on the type of proximity reader being used. Since these cards and key tags do not require physical contact with the reader, they are virtually maintenance and wear-free.
 ISO Magnetic Stripe - A magnetic stripe card is a type of card capable of storing data by modifying the magnetism of tiny iron-based magnetic particles on a band of magnetic material on the card. The magnetic stripe, sometimes called swipe card or magstripe, is read by physical contact and swiping past a magnetic reading head.

Software
There are basically two categories of card printer software: desktop-based, and web-based (online). The biggest difference between the two is whether or not a customer has a printer on their network that is capable of printing identification cards. If a business already owns an ID card printer, then a desktop-based badge maker is probably suitable for their needs. Typically, large organizations who have high employee turnover will have their own printer. A desktop-based badge maker is also required if a company needs their IDs make instantly. An example of this is the private construction site that has restricted access. However, if a company does not already have a local (or network) printer that has the features they need, then the web-based option is a perhaps a more affordable solution. The web-based solution is good for small businesses that don't anticipate a lot of rapid growth, or organizations who either can't afford a card printer, or don't have the resources to learn how to set up and use one. Generally speaking, desktop-based solutions involve software, a database (or spreadsheet) and can be installed on a single computer or network.

Other options
Alongside the basic function of printing cards, card printers can also read and encode magnetic stripes as well as contact and contact free RFID chip cards (smart cards).  Thus card printers enable the encoding of plastic cards both visually and logically. Plastic cards can also be laminated after printing.  Plastic cards are laminated after printing to achieve a considerable increase in durability and a greater degree of counterfeit prevention. Some card printers come with an option to print both sides at the same time, which cuts down the time taken to print and less margin of error. In such printers one side of id card is printed and then the card is flipped in the flip station and other side is printed.

Applications
Alongside the traditional uses in time attendance and access control (in particular with photo personalization), countless other applications have been found for plastic cards, e.g. for personalized customer and members’ cards, for sports ticketing and in local public transport systems for the production of season tickets, for the production of school and college identity cards as well as for the production of national ID cards.

Technology
The choice of print technology has a great effect on the cost of the printer and cost of operation, speed, quality and permanence of documents, and noise. Some printer technologies do not work with certain types of physical media, such as carbon paper or transparencies.

A second aspect of printer technology that is often forgotten is resistance to alteration: liquid ink, such as from an inkjet head or fabric ribbon, becomes absorbed by the paper fibers, so documents printed with liquid ink are more difficult to alter than documents printed with toner or solid inks, which do not penetrate below the paper surface.

Cheques can be printed with liquid ink or on special cheque paper with toner anchorage so that alterations may be detected. The machine-readable lower portion of a cheque must be printed using MICR toner or ink. Banks and other clearing houses employ automation equipment that relies on the magnetic flux from these specially printed characters to function properly.

Modern print technology

The following printing technologies are routinely found in modern printers:

Toner-based printers

A laser printer rapidly produces high quality text and graphics. As with digital photocopiers and multifunction printers (MFPs), laser printers employ a xerographic printing process but differ from analog photocopiers in that the image is produced by the direct scanning of a laser beam across the printer's photoreceptor.

Another toner-based printer is the LED printer which uses an array of LEDs instead of a laser to cause toner adhesion to the print drum.

Liquid inkjet printers

Inkjet printers operate by propelling variably sized droplets of liquid ink onto almost any sized page. They are the most common type of computer printer used by consumers.

Solid ink printers

Solid ink printers, also known as phase-change ink or hot-melt ink printers, are a type of thermal transfer printer, graphics sheet printer or 3D printer . They use solid sticks, crayons, pearls or granular ink materials.  Common inks are CMYK-colored ink, similar in consistency to candle wax, which are melted and fed into a piezo crystal operated print-head. A Thermal transfer printhead jets the liquid ink on a rotating, oil coated drum. The paper then passes over the print drum, at which time the image is immediately transferred, or transfixed, to the page. Solid ink printers are most commonly used as color office printers and are excellent at printing on transparencies and other non-porous media. Solid ink is also called phase-change or hot-melt ink was first used by Data Products and Howtek, Inc., in 1984.   Solid ink printers can produce excellent results with text and images. Some solid ink printers have evolved to print 3D models, for example, Visual Impact Corporation of Windham, NH was started by retired Howtek employee, Richard Helinski whose 3D patents US4721635 and then US5136515 was licensed to Sanders Prototype, Inc., later named Solidscape, Inc.  Acquisition and operating costs are similar to laser printers. Drawbacks of the technology include high energy consumption and long warm-up times from a cold state. Also, some users complain that the resulting prints are difficult to write on, as the wax tends to repel inks from pens, and are difficult to feed through automatic document feeders, but these traits have been significantly reduced in later models. This type of thermal transfer printer is only available from one manufacturer, Xerox, manufactured as part of their Xerox Phaser office printer line. Previously, solid ink printers were manufactured by Tektronix, but Tektronix sold the printing business to Xerox in 2001.

Dye-sublimation printers

A dye-sublimation printer (or dye-sub printer) is a printer that employs a printing process that uses heat to transfer dye to a medium such as a plastic card, paper, or canvas. The process is usually to lay one color at a time using a ribbon that has color panels. Dye-sub printers are intended primarily for high-quality color applications, including color photography; and are less well-suited for text. While once the province of high-end print shops, dye-sublimation printers are now increasingly used as dedicated consumer photo printers.

Thermal printers

Thermal printers work by selectively heating regions of special heat-sensitive paper. Monochrome thermal printers are used in cash registers, ATMs, gasoline dispensers and some older inexpensive fax machines. Colors can be achieved with special papers and different temperatures and heating rates for different colors; these colored sheets are not required in black-and-white output. One example is Zink (a portmanteau of "zero ink").

Obsolete and special-purpose printing technologies 

The following technologies are either obsolete, or limited to special applications though most were, at one time, in widespread use.

Impact printers
 Impact printers rely on a forcible impact to transfer ink to the media. The impact printer uses a print head that either hits the surface of the ink ribbon, pressing the ink ribbon against the paper (similar to the action of a typewriter), or, less commonly, hits the back of the paper, pressing the paper against the ink ribbon (the IBM 1403 for example).  All but the dot matrix printer rely on the use of fully formed characters, letterforms that represent each of the characters that the printer was capable of printing. In addition, most of these printers were limited to monochrome, or sometimes two-color, printing in a single typeface at one time, although bolding and underlining of text could be done by "overstriking", that is, printing two or more impressions either in the same character position or slightly offset. Impact printers varieties include typewriter-derived printers, teletypewriter-derived printers, daisywheel printers, dot matrix printers, and line printers. Dot-matrix printers remain in common use  in businesses where multi-part forms are printed. An overview of impact printing contains a detailed description of many of the technologies used.

Typewriter-derived printers

Several different computer printers were simply computer-controllable versions of existing electric typewriters. The Friden Flexowriter and IBM Selectric-based printers were the most-common examples. The Flexowriter printed with a conventional typebar mechanism while the Selectric used IBM's well-known "golf ball" printing mechanism. In either case, the letter form then struck a ribbon which was pressed against the paper, printing one character at a time. The maximum speed of the Selectric printer (the faster of the two) was 15.5 characters per second.

Teletypewriter-derived printers

The common teleprinter could easily be interfaced with the computer and became very popular except for those computers manufactured by IBM. Some models used a "typebox" that was positioned, in the X- and Y-axes, by a mechanism, and the selected letter form was struck by a hammer. Others used a type cylinder in a similar way as the Selectric typewriters used their type ball. In either case, the letter form then struck a ribbon to print the letterform. Most teleprinters operated at ten characters per second although a few achieved 15 CPS.

Daisy wheel printers

Daisy wheel printers operate in much the same fashion as a typewriter. A hammer strikes a wheel with petals, the "daisy wheel", each petal containing a letter form at its tip. The letter form strikes a ribbon of ink, depositing the ink on the page and thus printing a character. By rotating the daisy wheel, different characters are selected for printing. These printers were also referred to as letter-quality printers because they could produce text which was as clear and crisp as a typewriter. The fastest letter-quality printers printed at 30 characters per second.

Dot-matrix printers

The term dot matrix printer is used for impact printers that use a matrix of small pins to transfer ink to the page. The advantage of dot matrix over other impact printers is that they can produce graphical images in addition to text; however the text is generally of poorer quality than impact printers that use letterforms (type).

Dot-matrix printers can be broadly divided into two major classes:
 Ballistic wire printers
 Stored energy printers

Dot matrix printers can either be character-based or line-based (that is, a single horizontal series of pixels across the page), referring to the configuration of the print head.

In the 1970s and '80s, dot matrix printers were one of the more common types of printers used for general use, such as for home and small office use. Such printers normally had either 9 or 24 pins on the print head (early 7 pin printers also existed, which did not print descenders). There was a period during the early home computer era when a range of printers were manufactured under many brands such as the Commodore VIC-1525 using the Seikosha Uni-Hammer system.  This used a single solenoid with an oblique striker that would be actuated 7 times for each column of 7 vertical pixels while the head was moving at a constant speed. The angle of the striker would align the dots vertically even though the head had moved one dot spacing in the time.  The vertical dot position was controlled by a synchronized longitudinally ribbed platen behind the paper that rotated rapidly with a rib moving vertically seven dot spacings in the time it took to print one pixel column. 24-pin print heads were able to print at a higher quality and started to offer additional type styles and were marketed as Near Letter Quality by some vendors. Once the price of inkjet printers dropped to the point where they were competitive with dot matrix printers, dot matrix printers began to fall out of favour for general use.

Some dot matrix printers, such as the NEC P6300, can be upgraded to print in color. This is achieved through the use of a four-color ribbon mounted on a mechanism (provided in an upgrade kit that replaces the standard black ribbon mechanism after installation) that raises and lowers the ribbons as needed. Color graphics are generally printed in four passes at standard resolution, thus slowing down printing considerably. As a result, color graphics can take up to four times longer to print than standard monochrome graphics, or up to 8-16 times as long at high resolution mode.

Dot matrix printers are still commonly used in low-cost, low-quality applications such as cash registers, or in demanding, very high volume applications like invoice printing. Impact printing, unlike laser printing, allows the pressure of the print head to be applied to a stack of two or more forms to print multi-part documents such as sales invoices and credit card receipts using continuous stationery with carbonless copy paper. It also has security advantages as ink impressed into a paper matrix by force is harder to erase invisibly. Dot-matrix printers were being superseded even as receipt printers after the end of the twentieth century.

Line printers

Line printers print an entire line of text at a time. Four principal designs exist.

Drum printers, where a horizontally mounted rotating drum carries the entire character set of the printer repeated in each printable character position.  The IBM 1132 printer is an example of a drum printer. Drum printers are also found in adding machines and other numeric printers (POS), the dimensions are compact as only a dozen characters need to be supported.

Chain or train printers, where the character set is arranged multiple times around a linked chain or a set of character slugs in a track traveling horizontally past the print line.  The IBM 1403 is perhaps the most popular and comes in both chain and train varieties.  The band printer is a later variant where the characters are embossed on a flexible steel band.  The LP27 from Digital Equipment Corporation is a band printer.
Bar printers, where the character set is attached to a solid bar that moves horizontally along the print line, such as the IBM 1443.
A fourth design, used mainly on very early printers such as the IBM 402, features independent type bars, one for each printable position. Each bar contains the character set to be printed.  The bars move vertically to position the character to be printed in front of the print hammer.

In each case, to print a line, precisely timed hammers strike against the back of the paper at the exact moment that the correct character to be printed is passing in front of the paper. The paper presses forward against a ribbon which then presses against the character form and the impression of the character form is printed onto the paper.  Each system could have slight timing issues, which could cause minor misalignment of the resulting printed characters.  For drum or typebar printers, this appeared as vertical misalignment, with characters being printed slightly above or below the rest of the line.  In chain or bar printers, the misalignment was horizontal, with printed characters being crowded closer together or farther apart.  This was much less noticeable to human vision than vertical misalignment, where characters seemed to bounce up and down in the line, so they were considered as higher quality print.

Comb printers, also called line matrix printers, represent the fifth major design. These printers are a hybrid of dot matrix printing and line printing. In these printers, a comb of hammers prints a portion of a row of pixels at one time, such as every eighth pixel. By shifting the comb back and forth slightly, the entire pixel row can be printed, continuing the example, in just eight cycles. The paper then advances, and the next pixel row is printed. Because far less motion is involved than in a conventional dot matrix printer, these printers are very fast compared to dot matrix printers and are competitive in speed with formed-character line printers while also being able to print dot matrix graphics.  The Printronix P7000  series of line matrix printers are still manufactured as of 2013.

Line printers are the fastest of all impact printers and are used for bulk printing in large computer centres. A line printer can print at 1100 lines per minute or faster, frequently printing pages more rapidly than many current laser printers.  On the other hand, the mechanical components of line printers operate with tight tolerances and require regular preventive maintenance (PM) to produce a top quality print. They are virtually never used with personal computers and have now been replaced by high-speed laser printers.  The legacy of line printers lives on in many operating systems, which use the abbreviations "lp", "lpr", or "LPT" to refer to printers.

Liquid ink electrostatic printers 
Liquid ink electrostatic printers use a chemical coated paper, which is charged by the print head according to the image of the document. The paper is passed near a pool of liquid ink with the opposite charge. The charged areas of the paper attract the ink and thus form the image. This process was developed from the process of electrostatic copying. Color reproduction is very accurate, and because there is no heating the scale distortion is less than  ±0.1%. (All laser printers have an accuracy of ±1%.)

Worldwide, most survey offices used this printer before color inkjet plotters become popular. Liquid ink electrostatic printers were mostly available in  width and also 6 color printing. These were also used to print large billboards. It was first introduced by Versatec, which was later bought by Xerox. 3M also used to make these printers.

Plotters 

Pen-based plotters were an alternate printing technology once common in engineering and architectural firms. Pen-based plotters rely on contact with the paper (but not impact, per se) and special purpose pens that are mechanically run over the paper to create text and images. Since the pens output continuous lines, they were able to produce technical drawings of higher resolution than was achievable with dot-matrix technology.  Some plotters used roll-fed paper, and therefore had a minimal restriction on the size of the output in one dimension. These plotters were capable of producing quite sizable drawings.

Other printers 

A number of other sorts of printers are important for historical reasons, or for special purpose uses.

 Digital minilab (photographic paper)
 Electrolytic printers
 Spark printer
 Barcode printer multiple technologies, including: thermal printing, inkjet printing, and laser printing barcodes
 Billboard / sign paint spray printers
 Laser etching (product packaging) industrial printers
 Microsphere (special paper)

Attributes

Connectivity 

Printers can be connected to computers in many ways: directly by a dedicated data cable such as the USB, through a short-range radio like Bluetooth, a local area network using cables (such as the Ethernet) or radio (such as WiFi), or on a standalone basis without a computer, using a memory card or other portable data storage device.

More than half of all printers sold at U.S. retail in 2010 were wireless-capable, but nearly three-quarters of consumers who have access to those printers weren't taking advantage of the increased access to print from multiple devices according to the new Wireless Printing Study.

Printer control languages 
Most printers other than line printers accept control characters or unique character sequences to control various printer functions.  These may range from shifting from lower to upper case or from black to red ribbon on typewriter printers to switching fonts and changing character sizes and colors on raster printers. Early printer controls were not standardized, with each manufacturer's equipment having its own set.  The IBM Personal Printer Data Stream (PPDS) became a commonly used command set for dot-matrix printers.

Today, most printers accept one or more page description languages (PDLs). Laser printers with greater processing power frequently offer support for variants of Hewlett-Packard's Printer Command Language (PCL), PostScript or XML Paper Specification. Most inkjet devices support manufacturer proprietary PDLs such as ESC/P. The diversity in mobile platforms have led to various standardization efforts around device PDLs such as the Printer Working Group (PWG's) PWG Raster.

Printing speed 

The speed of early printers was measured in units of characters per minute (cpm) for character printers, or lines per minute (lpm) for line printers. Modern printers are measured in pages per minute (ppm). These measures are used primarily as a marketing tool, and are not as well standardised as toner yields. Usually pages per minute refers to sparse monochrome office documents, rather than dense pictures which usually print much more slowly, especially color images. Speeds in ppm usually apply to A4 paper in most countries in the world, and letter paper size, about 6% shorter, in North America.

Printing mode 

The data received by a printer may be:

 A string of characters
 A bitmapped image
 A vector image
 A computer program written in a page description language, such as PCL or PostScript

Some printers can process all four types of data, others not.

 Character printers, such as daisy wheel printers, can handle only plain text data or rather simple point plots.
 Pen plotters typically process vector images. Inkjet based plotters can adequately reproduce all four.
 Modern printing technology, such as laser printers and inkjet printers, can adequately reproduce all four. This is especially true of printers equipped with support for PCL or PostScript, which includes the vast majority of printers produced today.

Today it is possible to print everything (even plain text) by sending ready bitmapped images to the printer. This allows better control over formatting, especially among machines from different vendors. Many printer drivers do not use the text mode at all, even if the printer is capable of it.

Monochrome, color and photo printers
A monochrome printer can only produce monochrome images, with only shades of a single color.  Most printers can produce only two colors, black (ink) and white (no ink). With half-tonning techniques, however, such a printer can produce acceptable grey-scale images too

A color printer can produce images of multiple colors. A photo printer is a color printer that can produce images that mimic the color range (gamut) and resolution of prints made from photographic film.

Page yield

The page yield is number of pages that can be printed from a toner cartridge or ink cartridge—before the cartridge needs to be refilled or replaced.
The actual number of pages yielded by a specific cartridge depends on a number of factors.

For a fair comparison, many laser printer manufacturers use the ISO/IEC 19752 process to measure the toner cartridge yield.

Economics
In order to fairly compare operating expenses of printers with a relatively small ink cartridge to printers with a larger, more expensive toner cartridge that typically holds more toner and so prints more pages before the cartridge needs to be replaced, many people prefer to estimate operating expenses in terms of cost per page (CPP).

Retailers often apply the "razor and blades" model: a company may sell a printer at cost and make profits on the ink cartridge, paper, or some other replacement part. This has caused legal disputes regarding the right of companies other than the printer manufacturer to sell compatible ink cartridges. To protect their business model, several manufacturers invest heavily in developing new cartridge technology and patenting it.

Other manufacturers, in reaction to the challenges from using this business model, choose to make more money on printers and less on ink, promoting the latter through their advertising campaigns. Finally, this generates two clearly different proposals: "cheap printer – expensive ink" or "expensive printer – cheap ink". Ultimately, the consumer decision depends on their reference interest rate or their time preference. From an economics viewpoint, there is a clear trade-off between cost per copy and cost of the printer.

Printer steganography 

Printer steganography is a type of steganography – "hiding data within data" – produced by color printers, including Brother, Canon, Dell, Epson, HP, IBM, Konica Minolta, Kyocera, Lanier, Lexmark, Ricoh, Toshiba and Xerox brand color laser printers, where tiny yellow dots are added to each page. The dots are barely visible and contain encoded printer serial numbers, as well as date and time stamps.

See also

 Campus card
 Cardboard modeling
 Dye-sublimation printer
 History of printing
 Label printer
 List of printer companies
 Print (command)
 Printer driver
 Print screen
 Print server
 Printer friendly (also known as a printable version)
 Printer point
 Printer (publishing)
 Printmaking
 Smart card
 Typewriter ribbon
 3D printing

References

External links
 

Computer printers
Office equipment
Typography
Articles containing video clips
Network appliances